Temnora trapezoidea is a moth of the family Sphingidae. It is found from Nigeria to Kenya, Tanzania and Zambia.

The length of the forewings is about 22 mm. It is similar to Temnora plagiata fuscata, but the costal trapezoidal patch has a distal edge roughly parallel to the outer margin giving a rounded outline. The forewing upperside has a subapical costal spot which is more distinct than in Temnora plagiata fuscata. The forewing underside is brown basally, gradually shading to brownish-orange. The marginal band is dark brown. The hindwing upperside is brown except for a slightly lighter patch at the tornus.

References

Temnora
Moths described in 1935
Taxa named by Benjamin Preston Clark